Andiagoundanoor village panchayat is one of the largest geographical areas in Tirupur district, Udumalpet taluk, Tamil Nadu, India. The village panchayat office is situated in Uralpatty. The panchayat comprises the following villages:
1. Uralpatty
2. Jakkampalayam
3. Andiagoundanoor
4. Amaravathy

Villages in Tiruppur district